Lawrence "Larry" S. DiCara (born in Dorchester, Boston) is an American attorney and author.

Early life and education 
DiCara was born in Dorchester, a neighborhood of Boston, Massachusetts, and is a graduate of the Boston Latin School. He holds degrees from University of Massachusetts, LL.D., (Hon.); Harvard University, John F. Kennedy School of Government, M.P.A.; Suffolk University Law School, J.D.; and Harvard College, A.B., cum laude. In 1966, DiCara attended Massachusetts Boys State and was elected to represent Massachusetts at American Legion Boys Nation.

Career 
From 1972 to 1981, DiCara was a member of the Boston City Council. In 1978, he was the Council President. When he took office at the age of 22, he became the youngest person to ever serve on the Boston City Council.

DiCara was a candidate for Treasurer and Receiver-General of Massachusetts in 1978. He finished second in the Democratic Primary behind incumbent Robert Q. Crane.

In 1983, he was a candidate for Mayor of Boston. He finished in fourth place with 9.09% of the vote.

In 1992, DiCara was an unsuccessful candidate for Chairman of the Massachusetts Democratic Party.

In addition to practicing law, DiCara has also taught at Harvard University, Boston University, and the University of Massachusetts Amherst. He has served as president or chairman of a number of charitable and civic organizations and has received numerous awards and recognitions.

He resides in Boston, MA.

Selected publications and works

 DiCara (with Chris Black) Turmoil and Transition in Boston: A Political Memoir from the Busing Era published August 15, 2013 by Hamilton Books. . Chris Black is listed as contributor. The author describes how he was affected personally and politically by the 1970s federally mandated policy that required Boston public school students to be reassigned to schools around the city in order to achieve racial integration.
DiCara (with James D Sutherland) has contributed several columns to Commonwealth Magazine analyzing the Boston mayoral election, 2013 and electoral shifts occurring in the city.
 DiCara (with Charles P. Kindregan) Public education in Greater Boston : does America’s commitment to equality and integration stop at the city line?, Boston : Legal-Medical Studies, inc., 1977

References

Lawyers from Boston
Massachusetts Democrats
Suffolk University Law School alumni
Harvard Kennedy School alumni
Boston City Council members
Living people
1949 births
Boston Latin School alumni
Harvard College alumni
People from Jamaica Plain